Terrell is an unincorporated community in Worth County, in the U.S. state of Georgia.

History
The community is named for Dr. William Terrell (1778–1855) of Sparta, Georgia, who served in the Georgia General Assembly and the United States House of Representatives.

References

Unincorporated communities in Georgia (U.S. state)
Unincorporated communities in Worth County, Georgia